Kianoush Ayari (born May 14, 1951) is an Iranian director and screenwriter. He is famous for his realistic style and unique stories like heart transplantation in his movie To Be or Not to Be (1998) or fate of a teacher after the horrible Bam earthquake in Wake Up, Arezoo! (2005). He has received various accolades, including four Crystal Simorgh, a Hafez Award, two Iran Cinema Celebration Awards and three Iran's Film Critics and Writers Association Awards.

Life and career
He was born in the city of Ahvaz, southwest of Iran. Ayari started his cinematic career by making 8mm short films. His first professional movie was Tanooreyeh Div. His movie Abadani-ha won the Silver Leopard for the best Movie at Locarno Film Festival in 1994. His most controversial movie The Paternal House was screened at 69th Venice Film Festival but yet to be screened publicly in Iran as of december 2016 but was screened at a few cinemas in United States of America. Mehdi Hashemi, one of the best actors of Iranian theatre and cinema has played the main actor role in his movies for the last two decades, including: Thousand Eyes (TV Series), Roozegar-e Gharib (TV Series), The Paternal House and his latest movie Kanape'''.

Personal life
His brother Dariush Ayari is a cinematographer. They collaborated in Thousand Eyes (TV Series), Roozegar-e Gharib (TV Series) and The Paternal House''.

Filmography

Cinema
 Taze-nafas-ha (1979)
 Tanooreyeh Div (1985)
 The Spirit of Scorpion (1986)
 The Grand Day (1988)
 Beyond the Fire (1990)
 Two Halves of an Apple (1991)
 The Abadanis (1993)
 Cow's Horn (1995)
 To Be or Not to Be (1998)
 Iranian Spread (2002)
 Wake up, Arezoo! (2004)
 The Paternal House (2012)
 Canape' (2016)

TV Series
 Thousand Eyes (2003)
 Roozegar-e Gharib (2007)

Awards
Here is a list of awards received by Kianoush Ayari in film festivals:

See also
Iranian New Wave
Cinema of Iran
Mehdi Hashemi

References

External links
 

1951 births
Living people
Iranian film directors
Crystal Simorgh for Best Director winners
People from Ahvaz